WESCO International, Inc. is an American publicly traded Fortune 500 holding company for WESCO Distribution, a multinational electrical distribution and services company based in Pittsburgh, Pennsylvania.

WESCO International, Inc. is a provider of electrical, industrial, communications, maintenance, repair and operating (MRO), and original equipment manufacturer (OEM) products, as well as construction materials and advanced supply chain management/logistic services. In 2019, its total revenue was approximately $17 billion. The company employs 18,000 employees and 30,000 suppliers to serve more than 150,000 active customers worldwide. WESCO customers include commercial and industrial businesses, contractors, government agencies, institutions, telecommunications providers, and utilities. WESCO operates 10 fully automated distribution centers and 500 branches in North American and international markets.

History and acquisitions
WESCO Distribution was formed in 1922 as a subsidiary of the Westinghouse Electric Corporation, a company also based in Pittsburgh. It served as the Westinghouse subsidiary charged with selling and distributing company components in the electrical and industrial industries. WESCO maintained close ties to its parent.

In 1994, the private equity firm Clayton, Dubilier & Rice (CD&R) purchased Westinghouse Electrical Supply Company and created WESCO Distribution Inc.

In June 1998, CD&R sold WESCO to The Cypress Group bfor USD 1.1 billion, which formed WESCO International Inc., the current owner of WESCO Distribution.

In the same year, WESCO acquired the Bruckner Supply Company Inc., a provider of integrated supply management solutions and MRO products to Fortune 500 customers.

On May 12, 1999, WESCO held its initial public offering on the New York Stock Exchange, selling 9.72 million shares for $18 per share and raising a total of $175 million.

In 2005, WESCO acquired the Carlton-Bates Company, a provider of original equipment products and supply solutions to industrial customers. In the same year, Forbes magazine named WESCO as one of their 400 Best Big Companies, an honor which was received again in 2006, 2007, and 2009.

In 2006, WESCO acquired the Communication Supply Corporation, a national distributor of data communications products for enterprise and data center customers.

In 2008, the company was recognized for "environmentally sustainable business practices" through an Environmental Stewardship Award from Veolia ES Technical Solutions.

In November 2010 the company acquired TVC Communications.

In 2010, WESCO acquired Calgary, Alberta based Brews Supply Ltd.

In 2012, WESCO acquired EECOL Electric Corp.

In June 2012, the company acquired Conney Safety Products, LLC.

In 2014, WESCO acquired Hazmasters Inc.

In 2015, WESCO acquired Hill Country Electric Supply, Aelux, and Needham Electric Supply.

In 2016, WESCO acquired Atlanta Electrical Distributors, LLC.

Soon after, WESCO acquired OSRAM's Sylvania Lighting Solutions (SLS), now known as WESCO Energy Solutions.

On January 13, 2020, WESCO agreed to acquire Anixter.

On September 7, 2022, WESCO agreed to acquire Rahi Systems.

Executive officers
 John J. Engel – chairman, President & CEO
 David S. Schulz – Executive Vice President & Chief Financial Officer
 Diane E. Lazzaris – Executive Vice President & General Counsel
 Christine A. Wolf – Executive Vice President & Chief Human Resources Officer
 Theodore A. Dosch – Executive Vice President, Strategy & Chief Transformation Officer
 Nelson J. Squires III – Executive Vice President & General Manager, Electrical & Electronic Solutions
 William Clayton Geary II – Executive Vice President & General Manager, Communications & Security Solutions
 James Cameron – Executive Vice President & General Manager, Utility & Broadband Solutions
 Hemant Porwal – Executive Vice President, Supply Chain & Operations
 Roy W. Haley – Former Chairman, President & CEO 05/1998 - 09/2009; Former CEO 02/1994 - 05/1998
 Akash Khurana - CDIO

Board of directors 
 John J. Engel – chairman, President & CEO of WESCO International
 Matthew J. Espe – Operating Partner of Advent International
 Bobby J. Griffin – Former President, International Operations of Ryder System, Inc.
 John K. Morgan – Former Chairman, President & CEO of Zep, Inc.
 Steven A. Raymund – Former Chairman & CEO of Tech Data Corporation
 James L. Singleton – Chairman & CEO of Cürex Group Holdings, LLC.
 Easwaran Sundaram – Executive VP and Chief Digital & Technology Officer of JetBlue Airways Corporation
 Lynn M. Utter – Principal and Chief Talent Officer, Atlas Holdings
 Laura K. Thompson – Former Executive Vice President of The Goodyear Tire & Rubber Company.
Board Members' terms expire in May 2020.

References

External links

Companies listed on the New York Stock Exchange
Conglomerate companies of the United States
Companies based in Pittsburgh
American companies established in 1922
1922 establishments in Pennsylvania
Conglomerate companies established in 1922
Business services companies established in 1922
Distribution companies of the United States
1994 mergers and acquisitions
1999 initial public offerings